Nidhi is a Hindic surname. Notable people with the surname include:

Aishveryaa Nidhi, Indian Australian actor, director, writer, and theatre personality
Bimalendra Nidhi (born 1956), Government Minister of Nepal 
Mahendra Narayan Nidhi (1922–1999), Nepali politician

Surnames of Indian origin